North Cregg are an Irish traditional band from Cork, Ireland.  They were formed in 1996 out of Cork's pub session scene.

The name "North Cregg" comes from a tune composed by uilleann piper Jimmy Morrison who named his composition after a small townland near Fermoy, County Cork.

As of 2010, the members of North Cregg included Christy Leahy (button box), Liam Flannigan (fiddle, banjo), Ciaran Coughlan (piano), Martin Leahy (guitar, drums) and vocalist Claire-Anne Lynch, who also plays fiddle.

The band were voted "Best Traditional Newcomers" at the Irish Music Magazine Millennium Awards in 2000, and by 2008, the group had played at Glastonbury and folk festivals including Irish Fest (Milwaukee), Tønder Festival (Denmark), and Celtic Connections (Glasgow). As of late 2010, the group had produced four albums.  The latest of these, titled "The Roseland Barndance" album, was released in February 2007 on the Greentrax Recordings label.  This album included guest appearances by Dirk Powell (clawhammer banjo), Chris McCarthy (double bass) and Seamus Burns (spoons).

Discography 
... and they danced all night (1999)
mi.da:za (2001)
Summer at my feet (2003)
The Roseland Barndance (2007)

References

Irish folk musical groups
Musical groups from Cork (city)